Traxx may refer to
Alstom Traxx, formerly Bombardier TRAXX, a family of locomotives
American Dance Traxx, an American dance music countdown program
TraxX, a South Korean electronic dance music group
Traxx (film), a 1988 film with Shadoe Stevens and Priscilla Barnes
Traxx (video game), a computer maze game released in 1983 by Quicksilva
TraXX FM, a radio station operated by Radio Televisyen Malaysia
Traxx Radio, a former independent digital media broadcaster based in Brisbane, Australia
Y-Traxx, a defunct band

See also
 
 Trax (disambiguation)